Charles Edward Newton (November 15, 1916  April 5, 1994) was an American football quarterback, running back, and fullback who played two seasons in the National Football League (NFL) for the Philadelphia Eagles.  He played college football at the University of Washington and was drafted in the second round of the 1939 NFL Draft.

College
Newton was a three-year letterman including at quarterback while at Washington, from 1936 to 1938.

References

1916 births
1994 deaths
American football fullbacks
Washington Huskies football players
Philadelphia Eagles players
People from Tippecanoe County, Indiana
Players of American football from Indiana